The Best of the Gipsy Kings is an album from the band Gipsy Kings. It was released on March 28, 1995, in the US.

A compilation of previous albums, which also includes a live release of "La Dona", "Galaxia" and "Vamos a Bailar" (previously released on Allegria) and the popular party Medley (consisting of a mix of Bamboleo, Volare, Djobi Djoba, Pida Me La and Baila Me).

It also includes the new song "A Tu Vera" in an acoustic tone. That song will only be re-released as a re-recorded version on the album Estrellas and its American version Tierra Gitana.

Greatest Hits which was released a year prior for European audience is a very similar compilation with a different song order and the replacement of "Viento Del Arena", "Quiero Saber", "Montaña", "Trista Pena", "Love & Liberté" and "A Tu Vera" by "Pida Me La", "A Mi Manera", "Tu Quieres Volver", "Soy", "La Quiero" and "Allegria". Also "La Dona" and "Galaxia" on this album are the live versions while the ones on Greatest Hits are studio versions. The song "Escucha Me" is also slightly different.

With over 1.5 million sales, The Best of the Gipsy Kings is the third bestselling Latin album in the US.

Track listing

Charts

Weekly charts

Year-end charts

Sales and certifications

See also
List of number-one Billboard Latin Pop Albums from the 1990s
List of best-selling Latin albums in the United States

References

External links
The Best of the Gipsy Kings at Discogs
The Best of the Gipsy Kings at gipsykings.net

Gipsy Kings albums
1995 greatest hits albums
Nonesuch Records compilation albums
Spanish-language compilation albums